Leopold Charles Maurice Stennett Amery  (22 November 1873 – 16 September 1955), also known as L. S. Amery, was a British Conservative Party politician and journalist. During his career, he was known for his interest in military preparedness, British India and the British Empire and for his opposition to appeasement. After his retirement and death, he was perhaps best known for the remarks he made in the House of Commons on 7 May 1940 during the Norway Debate.  

In these remarks, Amery attacked the Prime Minister, Neville Chamberlain, for incompetence in the fight against Hitler’s Germany. Many of Amery’s Parliamentary contemporaries pointed to this speech as one of the key drivers in the division of the House on the following day, 8 May, which led to Chamberlain being forced out of office and his replacement by Winston Churchill.

Early life and education
Amery was born in Gorakhpur, British India, to an English father and a mother of Hungarian Jewish descent. His father was Charles Frederick Amery (1833–1901), of Lustleigh, Devon, an officer in the Indian Forestry Commission. His mother Elisabeth Johanna Saphir (c. 1841–1908), who was the sister of the orientalist Gottlieb Wilhelm Leitner, had come to India from England, where her parents had settled and converted to Protestantism. In 1877 his mother moved back to England from India, and in 1885 she divorced Charles.

In 1887, Amery went to Harrow School, where he was a contemporary of Winston Churchill. Amery represented Harrow at gymnastics and held the top position in examinations for a number of years; he also won prizes and scholarships.

After Harrow he went to Balliol College, Oxford, where he performed well. He gained a First in Classical Moderations in 1894; in literae humaniores ("Greats", i.e. classics) in 1896 and was proxime accessit (runner-up) to the Craven scholar in 1894 and Ouseley scholar in Turkish in 1896. He also won a half-blue in cross-country running.

He was elected a fellow of All Souls College. He could speak Hindi at the age of three years; Amery was born in India and would naturally have acquired the language of his ayah (nanny). He could converse in French, German, Italian, Bulgarian, Turkish, Serbian and Hungarian. Amery was an active freemason.

Journalism
During the Second Boer War Amery was a correspondent for The Times. In 1901, in his articles on the conduct of the war, he attacked the British commander, Sir Redvers Buller, which contributed to Buller's sacking. Amery was the only correspondent to visit Boer forces and was nearly captured with Churchill. Amery later edited and largely wrote The Times History of the South African War (7 vol., 1899–1909).

The Boer War had exposed deficiencies in the British Army and in 1903, Amery wrote The Problem of the Army and advocated its reorganisation. In The Times he penned articles attacking free trade using the pseudonym "Tariff Reformer" and in 1906, he wrote The Fundamental Fallacies of Free Trade. Amery described it as "a theoretical blast of economic heresy" because he argued that the total volume of British trade was less important than the question of whether British trade was making up for the nation's lack of raw materials and food by exporting its surplus manufactured goods, shipping, and financial acumen.

He was a member of the Coefficients dining club of social reformers, set up in 1902 by the Fabian campaigners Sidney and Beatrice Webb.

Early political career
Amery turned down the chance to be editor of The Observer in 1908 and The Times in 1912 to concentrate on politics.

Standing as a Liberal Unionist (a party in an electoral alliance with the Conservatives) Amery narrowly failed to win the 1908 Wolverhampton East by-election, by eight votes. In 1911 Amery stood in the  1911 Birmingham South by-election again as a Liberal Unionist, this time unopposed and became a Member of Parliament (MP). One reason that Amery agreed to stand there under the Liberal Unionist label (that party would fully merge with the Conservative Party the following year) was that he had been a longtime political admirer of Joseph Chamberlain and was an ardent supporter of tariff reform and imperial federation. According to A. J. P. Taylor, Amery was a rare Conservative to promote protectionism "as merely the beginning of a planned economy".

First World War

During the First World War, Amery's knowledge of Hungarian led to his employment as an Intelligence Officer in the Balkans campaign. Later, as war cabinet secretary in Lloyd George's coalition government, Amery was vested with parliamentary under-secretary like powers, and at the request of Lord Milner, he redrafted the Balfour Declaration. He also encouraged Ze'ev Jabotinsky in the formation of the Jewish Legion for the British Army in Palestine.

Amery was opposed to the Constitution of the League of Nations because he believed that the world was not equal and so the League, which granted all states equal voting rights, was absurd. He instead believed that the world was tending towards larger and larger states that made up a balanced world of inherently stable units. He contrasted that idea with what he called US President Woodrow Wilson's "facile slogan of self-determination".

First Lord of the Admiralty
After the war, Amery was elected to the newly created seat of Birmingham Sparkbrook in the 1918 general election. From 1919 to 1921 he was Lord Milner's personal secretary at the Colonial Office.  He was First Lord of the Admiralty (1922–1924) under Bonar Law and Stanley Baldwin. The Washington Naval Conference of 1921 to 1922 resulted in the 1922 Washington Naval Treaty, which reduced the strength of the Royal Navy and the naval estimates from over £83,000,000 to £58,000,000. Amery defended the financing of the Singapore Naval Base against both Liberal and Labour attacks.

Colonial Secretary
Amery was Colonial Secretary in Baldwin's government from 1924 to 1929. Amery expanded the role of the Commercial Adviser into the Economic and Financial Advisership under Sir George Schuster. He also created the post of Chief Medical Adviser, under Sir Thomas Stanton, and a range of advisers on education (Sir Hanns Visscher for Tropical Africa), agriculture (Sir Frank Stockdale), a Veterinary Adviser, and a Fisheries Adviser. He also set up the Empire Marketing Board. 

A favourite scheme was to develop one or more colonies into white-ruled dominions, with special attention to Southern Rhodesia, Kenya, and Palestine. In Africa, he sought to create an East African Dominion composed of Kenya, Uganda and Tanganyika. The Permanent Mandates Commission, which oversaw Tanganyika (a mandated territory), opposed Amery's plan. The strong opposition by the overwhelming nonwhite populations in Africa, and by the Arabs in Palestine, destroyed his plans. In India, the strong resistance of the Congress movement defeated his hopes for greater integration into the Commonwealth.

Out of office
Amery was not invited to join the National Government formed in 1931. He remained in Parliament but joined the boards of several prominent corporations.  That was necessary as he had no independent means and had depleted his savings during the First World War and when he was a cabinet minister during the 1920s. Among his directorships were the boards of several German metal fabrication companies (representing British capital invested in the companies), the British Southern Railway, the Gloucester Wagon Company, Marks and Spencer, the famous shipbuilding firm Cammell Laird and the Trust and Loan of Canada. He was also chairman of the Iraq Currency Board.

In the course of his duties as a director of German metal fabrication companies, Amery gained a good understanding of German military potential.  Adolf Hitler became alarmed at the situation and ordered a halt to non-German directors.  Amery had spent a lot of time in Germany during the 1930s in connection with his work.  He was not allowed to send his director's fees out of the country so he took his family on holiday in the Bavarian Alps.  He had a lengthy meeting with Hitler on at least one occasion, and he met at length with Czech leader Edvard Beneš, Austrian leaders Engelbert Dollfuss and Kurt von Schuschnigg and Italian leader Benito Mussolini.

Later career

Opposition to appeasement of Germany
In the debates on the need for an increased effort to rearm British forces, Amery tended to focus on army affairs, with Churchill speaking more about air defence and Roger Keyes talking about naval affairs. Austen Chamberlain was, until his death, a member of the group as well. While there was no question that Churchill was the most prominent and effective, Amery's work was still significant. He was a driving force behind the creation of the Army League, a pressure group designed to keep the needs of the British Army before the public.

In the 1930s Amery, along with Churchill, was a bitter critic of the appeasement of Germany; they often openly attacked their own party. Being a former Colonial and Dominions Secretary, he was very aware of the views of the dominions and strongly opposed returning Germany's colonies, a proposal seriously considered by Neville Chamberlain.

On the rearmament question, Amery was consistent. He advocated a higher level of expenditure, but also a reappraisal of priorities through the creation of a top-level cabinet position to develop overall defence strategy so that the increased expenditures could be spent wisely. He thought that either he or Churchill should be given the post. When the post of Minister for Co-ordination of Defence was finally created and given to a political lightweight, Sir Thomas Inskip, he regarded it as a joke.

When war came Amery opposed cooperation with the Soviet Union against Germany. He was a lifelong anticommunist.

When Chamberlain announced his flight to Munich to the cheers of the House, Amery was one of only four members who remained seated (the others were Churchill, Anthony Eden, and Harold Nicolson).

Amery differed from Churchill in hoping throughout the 1930s to foster an alliance with fascist Italy to counter the rising strength of Nazi Germany. A united front of Britain, France, and Italy would, he felt, have prevented a German occupation of Austria, especially with Czechoslovakia's support. He thus was for appeasing Italy by tacitly conceding its claims to Ethiopia. A start was made in the so-called Stresa Front of 1935, but he felt that Britain's decision to impose economic sanctions on Italy, for invading Ethiopia in 1936, drove Italy into the arms of Germany.

Second World War
Amery is famous for two moments of high drama in the House of Commons, early in the Second World War. On 2 September 1939, Neville Chamberlain spoke in a Commons debate and strongly implied that he was not declaring war on Germany immediately even if it had invaded Poland. Amery was greatly angered, and Chamberlain was felt by many present to be out of touch with the temper of the British people. As Labour Party leader Clement Attlee was absent, Arthur Greenwood stood up in his place and announced that he was speaking for Labour. Amery shouted, "Speak for England, Arthur!" That strongly implied that Chamberlain was not doing so.

The second incident occurred during the Norway Debate in 1940. After a string of military and naval disasters had been announced, Amery famously attacked Chamberlain's government in a devastating speech, finishing by quoting Oliver Cromwell: "You have sat too long here for any good you have been doing. Depart, I say, and let us have done with you. In the name of God, go!" Lloyd George afterwards told Amery that in 50 years, he had heard few speeches that matched his in sustained power and none with so dramatic a climax. The debate led to 42 Conservative Members of Parliament voting against Chamberlain and 36 abstaining, leading to the downfall of the Conservative government and the formation of a national government under Churchill's premiership. Amery himself noted in his diary that he believed that his speech was one of his best received in the House and that he had made a difference to the outcome of the debate.

Secretary of State for India and Burma
During the Churchill war ministry Amery was Secretary of State for India despite the fact that Churchill and Amery had long disagreed on the fate of India. Amery was disappointed not to be made a member of the small War Cabinet, but he was determined to do all he could in the position he was offered. He was continually frustrated by Churchill's intransigence, and in his memoirs, he recorded that Churchill knew "as much of the Indian problem as George III did of the American colonies".

Amery opposed holding an inquiry for the 1943 Bengal famine, fearing that the political consequences could be "disastrous". In 1944, the Famine Inquiry Commission was held against his advice.

Last years
At the 1945 general election, Amery lost his seat to Labour's Percy Shurmer. He was offered but refused a peerage because it might, when he died, have cut short the political career of his son, Julian, in the House of Commons. However, he was made a Companion of Honour. In retirement, Amery published a three-volume autobiography My Political Life (1953–1955).

Legacy
Throughout his political career, Amery was an exponent of Imperial unity, as he saw the British Empire as a force for justice and progress in the world. He strongly supported the evolution of the dominions into independent nations bound to Britain by ties of kinship, trade, defence and a common pride in the Empire. He also supported the gradual evolution of the colonies, particularly India, to the same status, unlike Churchill, a free trader, who was less interested in the Empire as such and more in Britain itself as a great power. Amery felt that Britain itself was too weak to maintain its great power position.

Amery was very active in imperial affairs during the 1920s and 1930s. He was in charge of colonial affairs and relations with the dominions from 1924 to 1929. In the 1930s, he was a member of the Empire Industries Association and a chief organiser of the huge rally celebrating the empire at the Royal Albert Hall in 1936 marking the centenary of Joseph Chamberlain's birth. Amery maintained a very busy speaking schedule, with almost 200 engagements between 1936 and 1938, many of them devoted to imperial topics, especially Imperial Preference. Amery distrusted the administration of US President Franklin Roosevelt. He resented American pressure on Canada to oppose imperial free trade. While that pressure was unsuccessful as long as Canadian Conservative Prime Minister Richard Bedford Bennett was in power, after Bennett lost the 1935 election his Liberal successor William Lyon Mackenzie King adopted a more pro-American stance.

Amery wanted to keep the UK and the newly independent British Dominions united by trade behind a common tariff barrier and away from the United States. He viewed American intentions regarding the British Empire with increasingly grave suspicion. He hoped the Labour government elected in 1945 would resist promises of trade liberalisation made by Churchill to the United States during the Second World War. Amery's hopes were partially vindicated when the Attlee government, under intense American pressure, insisted upon the continuation of Imperial/Commonwealth Preference but conceded its more limited scope and promised against further expansion.

Personal life

Amery was a noted sportsman, especially famous as a mountaineer. He continued to climb well into his sixties, especially in the Swiss Alps but also in Bavaria, Austria, Yugoslavia, Italy and the Canadian Rockies, where Mount Amery is named after him. He enjoyed skiing as well. He was a member of the Alpine Club (serving as its president, 1943–1945) and of the Athenaeum and Carlton Clubs.

He was a Senior Knight Vice President of the Knights of the Round Table.

On 16 November 1910, Amery married Florence Greenwood (1885–1975), daughter of the Canadian barrister John Hamar Greenwood and younger sister of Hamar Greenwood, 1st Viscount Greenwood. She was normally known by the forename Bryddie. They had two sons.

Their elder son, John Amery (1912–1945), became a Nazi sympathizer. During the Second World War he made propaganda broadcasts from Germany, and induced a few British prisoners of war to join the German-controlled British Free Corps. After the war, he was tried for treason, pleaded guilty, and was hanged. His father amended his entry in Who's Who to read "one s[on]", with the editors' permission. The playwright Ronald Harwood, who explored the relationship between Leo and John Amery in his play An English Tragedy (2008), considered it significant to the son's story that the father had apparently concealed his partly-Jewish ancestry.

Amery's younger son, Julian Amery (1919–1996), served first in the Royal Air Force and then the British Army during World War Two, and later became a Conservative politician. He served in the cabinets of Harold Macmillan and Sir Alec Douglas-Home as Minister for Aviation (1962–1964) and also held junior ministerial office under Edward Heath.  He married Macmillan's daughter Catherine.

Amery is buried in the churchyard of St John the Baptist in his father's home village of Lustleigh, and an ornate plaque in commemoration of him is inside the church.

Notes

References
 Encyclopædia Britannica, online edition
 L. S. Amery, My Political Life. Volume One: England Before the Storm. 1896–1914 (London: Hutchinson, 1953)
 L. S. Amery, My Political Life. Volume Two: War and Peace. 1914–1929 (London: Hutchinson, 1953)
 L. S. Amery, My Political Life. Volume Three: The Unforgiving Years. 1929–1940 (London: Hutchinson, 1955)
 L. S. Amery, Days of Fresh Air, Being Reminiscences of Outdoor Life  (London: Hutchinson Universal Book Club, 1940)
 David Faber, Speaking for England: Leo, Julian and John Amery: The Tragedy of a Political Family, (Free Press, 2005) 
 Deborah Lavin, ‘Amery, Leopold Charles Maurice Stennett  (1873–1955)’, Oxford Dictionary of National Biography, Oxford University Press, 2004; online edn, January 2011, accessed 2 June 2011
 
 Nigel Nicolson (ed.), The Diaries and Letters of Harold Nicolson. Volume II: The War Years, 1939–1945 (New York: Atheneum, 1967)
 William Rubinstein, 'The secret of Leopold Amery', Historical Research, vol. 73, no. 181 (June 2000), pp. 175–196

Further reading
 
John Barnes and David Nicholson (eds.), The Leo Amery Diaries. 1896–1929 (London: Hutchinson, 1980)
John Barnes and David Nicholson (eds.), The Empire at Bay. The Leo Amery Diaries. 1929–1945 (London: Hutchinson, 1987)
Stephen Constantine, The Making of British Colonial Development Policy (London: Routledge, 1984)
David Goldsworthy, Colonial Issues in British Politics, 1945–1961 (Oxford University Press, 1971)
Wm Roger Louis, In the name of God, go! Leo Amery and the British empire in the age of Churchill (W. W. Norton & Co., 1992) online free
W. R. Louis, 'Leo Amery and the post-war world, 1945–55', Journal of Imperial and Commonwealth History, 30 (2002), pp. 71–90
Philip Williamson, National Crisis and National Government: British Politics, the Economy and Empire, 1926–1932 (Cambridge University Press, 1992)

Primary sources

 Leo Amery, The Problem of the Army (1903) Link.
 Leo Amery, Fundamental Fallacies of Free Trade (1906) Link.
 Leo Amery, 'The Times' History of the war in South Africa, 1899–1900 (Vol I) (1900) Link.
 Leo Amery, The Times' History of the war in South Africa, 1899–1900 (Vol II) (1902) Link.
 Leo Amery, The Times' History of the war in South Africa, 1899–1900 (Vol III) (1905) Link.
 Leo Amery, The Times' History of the war in South Africa, 1899–1902 (Vol IV) (1906) Link.
 Leo Amery, '''The Times' History of the war in South Africa, 1899–1902 (Vol V) (1907) Link.
 Leo Amery, The Times' History of the war in South Africa, 1899–1902 (Vol VI) (1909) Link.
 Leo Amery, The Times' History of the war in South Africa, 1899–1902 (Vol VII) (1909) Link.
 Leo Amery, The Great Question: Tariff Reform or Free Trade? (1909) Link to library source.
 Leo Amery, Union and Strength (1912) Link.
 Leo Amery, The Empire in the New Era (1928) Link to library source.
 Leo Amery, Empire and Prosperity (1930) short work Link to library source.
 Leo Amery, A Plan of Action (1932) Link.
 Leo Amery, The Stranger of the Ulysses (1934) Link to library source.
 Leo Amery, The Forward View (1935) Link.
 Leo Amery, The Odyssey: Presidential address delivered to the Classical association (1936) short work Link to library source.
 Leo Amery, The German Colonial Claim (1939) Link to library source.
 Leo Amery, Days of Fresh Air (1939) Link.
 Leo Amery, India and Freedom (1942) Link to library source.
 Leo Amery, The Framework for the Future (1944) Link to library source.
 Leo Amery, The Washington Loan Agreements (1945) Link to library source.
 Leo Amery, In the Rain and the Sun (1946) Link to library source.
 Leo Amery, Thoughts on the Constitution (1947) Link.
 Leo Amery, The Elizabethan Spirit (1948) short work Link to library source
 Leo Amery, The Awakening: Our Present Crisis and the Way Out (1948) Link to library source.
 Leo Amery, Thought and Language (1949) short work' Link to library source.
 Leo Amery, My Political Life, Volume I, England Before the Storm, 1896–1914 (1953) Link.
 Leo Amery, My Political Life, Volume II, War and Peace, 1914–1929 (1953) Link.
 Leo Amery, My Political Life, Volume III, The Unforgiving Years, 1929–1940 (1955) Link.
 Leo Amery, A Balanced Economy (1954) Link to library source.
 Leo Amery, The Leo Amery diaries 1896–1929 (Vol I) (1980) Link to library source.
 Leo Amery, The Empire at bay: the Leo Amery diaries 1929–1945 (Vol II)'' (1988) Link to library source.

External links

 

 

1873 births
1955 deaths
Alumni of Balliol College, Oxford
Leo
British Secretaries of State for Dominion Affairs
British Secretaries of State
Conservative Party (UK) MPs for English constituencies
English people of Hungarian-Jewish descent
Fellows of All Souls College, Oxford
First Lords of the Admiralty
Foreign Office personnel of World War II
Freemasons of the United Grand Lodge of England
Jewish British politicians
Legion of Frontiersmen members
Liberal Unionist Party MPs for English constituencies
Members of the Order of the Companions of Honour
Members of the Privy Council of the United Kingdom
Ministers in the Churchill caretaker government, 1945
Ministers in the Churchill wartime government, 1940–1945
People educated at Harrow School
People from Gorakhpur
Presidents of the Alpine Club (UK)
Secretaries of State for India
Secretaries of State for the Colonies
UK MPs 1910–1918
UK MPs 1918–1922
UK MPs 1922–1923
UK MPs 1923–1924
UK MPs 1924–1929
UK MPs 1929–1931
UK MPs 1931–1935
UK MPs 1935–1945
Presidents of the Classical Association